Cao Rui (204 or 205 – 22 January 239), courtesy name Yuanzhong, was the second emperor of the state of Cao Wei during the Three Kingdoms period. His parentage is in dispute: his mother, Lady Zhen, was Yuan Xi's wife, but she later remarried Cao Pi, the first ruler of Wei. Based on conflicting accounts of his age, Pei Songzhi calculated that, in order to be Cao Pi's son, Cao Rui could not have been 33 (by East Asian age reckoning) when he died as recorded, so the recorded age was in error; late-Qing scholar Lu Bi and Mou Guangsheng argued instead that Cao Rui was Yuan Xi's son.

Cao Rui's reign was viewed in many different ways throughout Chinese history. He devoted many resources into building palaces and ancestral temples, and his reign saw the stalemate between his empire, Shu Han, and Eastern Wu become more entrenched. His building projects and his desire to have many concubines (who numbered in the thousands) greatly exhausted the imperial treasury. 

On his deathbed, he has no biological son. He passed the throne to his adopted son Cao Fang and entrusted him to the regency of Cao Shuang and Sima Yi. This would prove to be a fatal mistake for his clan, as Cao Shuang monopolised power and governed incompetently, eventually drawing a violent reaction from Sima Yi, who overthrew him in a coup d'état (Incident at the Gaoping Tombs). Sima Yi became in control of the Wei government from AD 249, eventually allowing his grandson Sima Yan to usurp the throne in AD 266. After his death, Cao Rui was posthumously honoured as "Emperor Ming" with the temple name "Liezu".

Family background
When Cao Rui was born (likely in 205), his grandfather Cao Cao was the paramount warlord of Han Dynasty, who had rendered Emperor Xian of Han a mere figurehead. His father Cao Pi was Cao Cao's oldest surviving son and the heir apparent. His mother Lady Zhen had been the wife of Yuan Shao's son Yuan Xi, but when she was seized by Cao Cao's army in September or October 204, Cao Pi forced her to marry him, and she gave birth to Cao Rui only eight months after the wedding—leading to theories that Cao Rui was actually biologically Yuan Xi's son and not Cao Pi's. Cao Pi, after his father's death in March 220, forced Emperor Xian to yield the throne to him and established Cao Wei in December of that year. Lady Zhen was not allowed to accompany him to the new capital Luoyang, and in August 221 he forced her to commit suicide.

Because of what happened to Lady Zhen and Cao Rui's unclear origin, even though Cao Rui was the oldest of Cao Pi's sons, he was not created crown prince early in his father's reign, but was only created the Prince of Pingyuan in March 222.  Sometime during his years as the Prince of Pingyuan, he married a daughter of an aristocrat, Lady Yu, as his wife and princess. He apparently had a cordial relationship with Lady Guo, who was created empress (in October 222), and as she was sonless, his status as heir apparent was not seriously challenged.  It is said that any thoughts that Cao Pi had at not making him heir was dissipated by a hunt; during that hunt, Cao Pi and Cao Rui had encountered a mother deer and a young deer. Cao Pi killed the mother deer with an arrow, and then ordered Cao Rui to kill the young deer. Cao Rui wept and said, "Your imperial majesty had already killed the mother, and I do not have the heart to kill the son as well." Cao Pi dropped his bow and arrows and became mournful.

In June 226, when Cao Pi became ill, he finally created Cao Rui crown prince.  He died soon thereafter, and Cao Rui became emperor at the age of 21.

As emperor
Cao Rui's reign was a paradoxical one in many ways.  He was clearly intelligent and capable, and yet never fulfilled his potential in his governance of the country or in his military campaigns.  He showed great compassion at times, and yet was capable of great cruelty.  He carried out many acts that were beneficial for the empire and yet at least as many that were hurtful.  Despite his uncle Cao Zhi's successive petitions, however, he continued the severe prohibitions against princes' holding of offices that his father Cao Pi had put in place, and this was commonly viewed by traditional historians as an eventual factor in the downfall of Cao Wei, as the Simas took power after Cao Rui's death without the imperial princes having any real ability to oppose them.

Treatment of officials
Cao Rui, a young adult when he became emperor, quickly showed a knack for finding capable officials to empower while maintaining steady control over them.  His father had appointed three regents for him—his distant cousin Cao Zhen, the steady administrator Chen Qun, and the shrewd strategist Sima Yi.  Once Cao Rui became emperor, however, he, while knowing the value of the advice of these senior officials, chose perhaps the best path to deal with them: honoring them and making them regional governors with full authority in the provinces they governed.  By doing this, he showed that he was his own man while at the same time continued to receive the wisdom of their advice.

Throughout Cao Rui's reign, he showed great diligence in seeking out advice from multiple officials, rather than concentrating on listening to several, before making important decisions.  He was generally cautious and not willing to take risks, but at the same time was, therefore, able to avoid major disasters for his empire.

Campaigns against Shu Han

One immediate threat that Cao Rui had to deal with after he became emperor were attacks from Shu Han's chancellor, Zhuge Liang.  Zhuge had, after the death of Shu Han's founding emperor, Liu Bei, initially taken a passive posture militarily with regard to the Shu Han-Cao Wei border, while reestablishing an alliance with Sun Quan's Eastern Wu, in order to rest the people and the troops.  In 227, he, under the theory that Shu Han was naturally a weaker state than Cao Wei and, if it had just sat and done nothing, would eventually be swallowed up by Cao Wei anyway, started a series of five campaigns north.

During these campaigns, Cao Rui's response generally was to head to the metropolitan Chang'an — a politically important city that Wei could not afford to lose — and then commission generals to the frontlines to ward off Zhuge's attacks.  This strategy had the effect of boosting the morale of the troops and shortening the communication line. Being fairly quickly updated as to the events at the frontlines, Cao Rui could also keep the central empire under his watch.  Ultimately, Zhuge's campaigns were futile; after his death in 234, his plan was largely abandoned by his successors Jiang Wan and Fei Yi.  That did not mean that there was peace on the borders with Shu Han, however, as nearly yearly there were battles between the two states.   However, there would be no major confrontations on the scale of Zhuge's campaigns for the rest of Cao Rui's reign.

Campaigns against Eastern Wu
During Cao Rui's reigns, there were also many battles waged against the other rival empire, Eastern Wu.  The very first came only two months after Cao Rui had become emperor in 226.  It was during that campaign that Cao Rui showed his acumen for judging a situation correctly—believing that by the time that reinforcements could be sent, Eastern Wu's monarch Sun Quan would have already withdrawn, and therefore sending reinforcements was pointless.  Throughout his reign, he would generally take a similar stance during campaigns against Eastern Wu as he did with Shu Han — head east personally to be close to the theater of the war, while remaining some distance away from the frontlines, which also proved to be effective.  He also entrusted the southeastern border to the capable Man Chong, and Man's stewardship averted many disasters.

Cao Rui's greatest military loss came in 228, when the Eastern Wu general Zhou Fang tricked Cao Rui's distant cousin and regional governor Cao Xiu into believing that he was ready to surrender his troops to Cao Wei, while instead laying a trap for Cao Xiu.  Instead of realizing that it was indeed a trap, Cao Rui enthusiastically approved Cao Xiu's plan, and this led to a major military disaster, but Cao Xiu's forces were saved by Jia Kui from total annihilation.

Another serious crisis posed by Eastern Wu occurred in 234, when Eastern Wu, in a semi-coordinated effort with Shu Han, launched an attack against Cao Wei simultaneously with Zhuge Liang's Northern Expeditions. At the time, many frontline officials were on vacation visiting families, so Man Chong requested Cao Rui to call them back to fight Sun Quan. Cao Rui refused to cancel his subordinates' vacation, and ordered Man to focus on the defense. Cao Rui then personally led the royal army as reinforcement, and acted as an effective coordinator of the various forces that Cao Wei had on Eastern Wu's borders, and Eastern Wu was unable to make substantial gains.

Campaigns against Liaodong

The only real military gain for Cao Wei during Cao Rui's reign was the end of the Gongsun clan's hold on Liaodong (modern central and eastern Liaoning), which was started by Gongsun Du in 190.  In 228, Gongsun Du's grandson Gongsun Yuan deposed his uncle Gongsun Gong in a coup and asked for an official commission from Cao Rui.  Acting against Liu Ye's advice to attack the Gongsuns while there was dissension within, Cao Rui instead gave Gongsun Yuan an official commission as governor of Liaodong Commandery.

In 232, Gongsun Yuan's repeated communicated with and sales of horses to Eastern Wu angered Cao Rui, who ordered his generals Tian Yu and Wang Xiong to attack Liaodong against Jiang Ji's advice; the attacks were not successful, although Tian was able to intercept the Eastern Wu horse-buying fleet and destroy it.  After the incident, although Gongsun formally maintained vassalage to Cao Wei, the relationship was damaged.

The next year saw that relationship would be somewhat improved.  Gongsun, apprehensive of another attack from Cao Wei, sent ambassadors to Eastern Wu to formally submit to its emperor Sun Quan.  Sun was so pleased that he immediately created Gongsun the Prince of Yan and granted him the nine bestowments, which were typically reserved for officials so powerful that the bestowments were typically viewed as a sign that the emperor was about to abdicate to them.  However, Gongsun realized later that Eastern Wu would be of little help in an expedition against him.  He betrayed Eastern Wu, slaughtered Sun's ambassadors as they arrived in Liaodong, and seized their troops.  In response, Cao Rui created Gongsun the Duke of Lelang.  (Part of the Eastern Wu troops were able to escape and eventually returned home with the assistance of Goguryeo, a rival of the Gongsuns.)

In 237, Cao Rui once again considered attacking Liaodong, angered by reports that Gongsun had repeatedly defamed him.  He commissioned Guanqiu Jian to prepare for an attack, and then ordered Gongsun to come to Luoyang for an official visit.  Gongsun refused and instead declared independence.  Guanqiu attacked him, but was stopped by torrential rains.  Gongsun then declared himself the Prince of Yan and entered into alliances with the Xianbei tribes to harass Cao Wei's borders.

The following year, Cao Rui sent Sima Yi with 40,000 men to attack Liaodong.  Upon hearing this, Gongsun again requested aid from Eastern Wu.  Sun, angry at Gongsun's previous betrayal, pretended to agree, but did not send Gongsun any actual help.  Although Sima's expeditionary force was also initially halted by torrential rains as Guanqiu's was, Sima waited out the rains and eventually surrounded Gongsun's capital of Xiangping (襄平, in modern Liaoyang, Liaoning), starving Gongsun's troops.  After nearly three months of siege, Xiangping fell, and Gongsun fled, but was captured and executed by Sima.  Liaodong became part of Cao Wei's domain.

Building projects and collection of concubines
Almost immediately after Cao Rui ascended the throne, he started out large scale palace and temple-building projects.  Part of it was to be expected—the Luoyang palaces had been remnants of the ones not destroyed by Dong Zhuo, and the temples were needed for the cults of his ancestors.  However, he went beyond the minimally required, and continued to build temples and palaces throughout the rest of his reign, severely draining the imperial treasury.  While he occasionally halted projects at the officials' behest, the projects would restart after brief breaks.  He not only built palaces in Luoyang, but also built a palace in Xuchang.  In 237, he further moved many of the magnificent statues and monuments that were commissioned by Emperor Wu of Han from Chang'an to Luoyang, costing great expenses and lives.  He further built gigantic bronze statues of his own and placed them on a man-made hill inside his palace, surrounded by rare trees and plants and populated by rare animals.

Cao Rui was also increasing his collection of women, as his concubines and ladies in waiting numbered thousands. His palace-building projects might have been with intent to house them. The contemporary historian Yu Huan said that in 237, Cao Rui even ordered that beautiful married women all be formally seized unless their husbands were able to ransom them, and that they would be married to soldiers instead—but that the most beautiful among them would become his concubines. Despite some officials' protestations, this decree was apparently carried out, much to the distress of his people.

Marriages, succession issues and death
When Cao Rui became emperor, it was commonly expected that his wife, Princess Yu, would be created empress, but she was not.  Rather, he created a favorite concubine, Consort Mao, empress in 227.  Princess Yu was exiled back to their original palace.  He loved Empress Mao dearly, and a number of her relatives, including her father and brother, became honored officials (but without actual powers).

Despite his collection of women, however, Cao Rui was without any son who survived infancy.  He adopted two sons to be his own -- Cao Fang and Cao Xun, whom he created princes in 235.  (It is usually accepted that they were sons of his cousins, although the exact parentage is not clear.)  In 237, Cao Rui took the unprecedented (and unrepeated in Chinese history) action of setting his own temple name of Liezu and ordering that his temple, in the future, never to be torn down.  (Based on Confucian regulations, except for the founder of the dynasty, rulers' temples would be destroyed after six generations.)  He carried out these actions apparently in apprehension that he would be given an unflattering temple name (or none at all) and that his temple would eventually be destroyed, due to his lack of biological issue and unclear origin.

By 237, Cao Rui's favorite was no longer Empress Mao, but Consort Guo.  Once, when Cao Rui was attending a feast hosted by Consort Guo, Consort Guo requested that Empress Mao be invited to join as well, but Cao Rui refused and further ordered that no news about the feast is to be given to Empess Mao.  However, the news leaked, and Empress Mao talked about the feast with him anyway.  He became exceedingly angry, and killed a number of his attendants whom he suspected of leaking the news to Empress Mao, and, inexplicably, ordered Empress Mao to commit suicide, even though she was still buried with honors due an empress, and her family remained honored.

In 238, Cao Rui grew ill.  He created Consort Guo empress in preparation of allowing her to become empress dowager after his death.  He initially wanted to entrust his adopted son, Cao Fang the Prince of Qi, to his uncle Cao Yu, to serve as the lead regent, along with Xiahou Xian, Cao Shuang, Cao Zhao, and Qin Lang.  However, his trusted officials Liu Fang and Sun Zi were unfriendly with Xiahou and Cao Zhao and were apprehensive about their becoming regents, and managed to persuade him to make Cao Shuang (with whom they were friendly) and Sima Yi regents instead.  Cao Yu, Cao Zhao, and Qin were excluded from the regency.  In the spring of 239, Cao Rui created the seven-year-old Cao Fang crown prince, and died the same day of that creation.  Cao Fang succeeded him as emperor.

Era names
Taihe 227–233
Qinglong 233–237
Jingchu 237–239

Family
Consorts and Issue:
 Princess consort, of the Yu clan
 Empress Mingdao, of the Mao clan (d. 237)
 Cao Yin, Prince Ai of Anping (231–232)
 Empress Mingyuan, of the Guo clan (d. 264)
 Princess Yi of Pingyuan (232), personal name Shu
 Unknown
 Cao Jiong, Prince of Qinghe (d. 226)
 Cao Mu, Prince of Fanyang (d. 229)
 Princess Qi
 Married Li Tao (d. 254), a son of Li Feng, and had issue (three sons)
 Married Ren Kai (223–284)

Ancestry

See also
 Cao Wei family trees
 Lists of people of the Three Kingdoms
 List of Chinese monarchs

Notes

References

=Citations

Bibliography
 Chen Shou (3rd century). Records of the Three Kingdoms (Sanguozhi).
 Pei Songzhi (5th century). Annotations to Records of the Three Kingdoms (Sanguozhi zhu).

205 births
239 deaths
3rd-century Chinese monarchs
Cao Wei emperors
People from Handan
Military strategists